Turnstile are an American hardcore punk band from Baltimore, Maryland, formed in 2010. They have released five EPs and three studio albums. The band's third album Glow On was released in 2021 to critical and commercial success; the songs "Holiday" and "Blackout" earned the band three nominations at the 65th Grammy Awards.

History

2010–2020: Early years and Nonstop Feeling
Turnstile was formed in 2010 and grew out of Baltimore's emerging hardcore scene. They released their debut EP, Pressure to Succeed, in 2011 and their second EP, Step 2 Rhythm, in 2013, both via Reaper Records. On January 13, 2015, Turnstile released their debut full-length album, Nonstop Feeling, on the same label. The album was recorded at Salad Days Studios with producer Brian McTernan. Supporting the release of the album, Turnstile went on both an East Coast and a West Coast tour with Superheaven, titled the Nonstop Feeling Tour. They also supported New Found Glory on their Spring 2015 tour. Following this tour, their guitarist Sean Coo stepped down, and a replacement was found in Pat McCrory of fellow Maryland-based hardcore band Angel Du$t. 

On September 16, 2016, Turnstile released their third EP, titled Move Thru Me. The record charted at No. 14 on the Billboard Heatseekers Album Chart and No. 19 on the Hard Rock Albums chart. The band embarked on the Move Thru Me Tour across the U.S. with support from Angel Du$t, Big Bite, Crimewatch, Fury and Lock on select dates in the fall of 2016. The band began recording for their second album under Roadrunner Records in the fall of 2017, completing recording in early 2018. The record was produced by Will Yip at his Studio 4 recording studio. On February 23, 2018, the band released the album, titled Time & Space – their first release under a major label.  This was followed by the band embarking across the U.S. on the Time & Space Tour with support from Touché Amoré, Culture Abuse and Razorbumps. A European leg followed this with support from Fury, a South Korean and Southeast Asia leg, and a U.K. leg with support from Wicca Phase Springs Eternal and Big Cheese. Three of the album's tracks were reworked with DJ and producer Mall Grab and released as an EP, titled Share A View, in January 2020.

2021–present: Glow On and Ebert's departure
On June 27, 2021, the band released their fifth EP, Turnstile Love Connection, alongside an accompanying short film directed by Yates. On July 15, 2021, the band announced the release of another album, Glow On. The first single from the album, "Alien Love Call", was released and featured British musician Blood Orange.

On July 27, 2021, it was announced by the Suicideboys on social media that they would be one of the performers for their Grey Day Tour that ran from September 25, 2021 to November 16 the same year, along with the other G59 artists, like Night Lovell, Ramirez, Germ, Shakewell, and Chetta. Other performers, like Slowthai, Chief Keef, and Yung Gravy were also present within some dates of the tour.

On August 27, 2021, the band's third full-length album, Glow On, was released, debuting at No. 30 on the Billboard 200. The album was met with universal acclaim from critics, and Rolling Stone listed Glow On at No. 8 on its list of The Best 50 Albums of 2021.

In March 2022, it was announced that the band would support My Chemical Romance on select dates of their North American Reunion Tour.

On August 12, 2022, the band announced via Instagram that they had parted ways with guitarist Brady Ebert, a couple of months ahead of their fall headlining tour. Before this, Ebert had notably been absent from the band's tours, and had been replaced by Greg Cerwonka of Take Offense.

On October 11, 2022, it was announced that the band would support Blink-182 on the North American leg of their upcoming 2023 global tour.

On November 15, 2022, it was announced that Turnstile was nominated for three Grammy Awards: "Holiday" was nominated for Best Rock Performance, and "Blackout" was nominated for both Best Rock Song and Best Metal Performance.

Musical style 
Critics and journalists have categorised Turnstile's music as hardcore punk, melodic hardcore, alternative rock and nu metal. In interviews, the members describe their own music as hardcore.

Members

Current members
Daniel Fang – drums, programming (2010–present)
Brendan Yates – lead vocals, percussion (2010–present)
"Freaky" Franz Lyons – bass, percussion, backing and lead vocals (2010–present)
Pat McCrory – rhythm guitar, backing vocals (2016–present)

Current touring musicians
Greg Cerwonka – lead guitar (2022–present)

Former members
Brady Ebert – lead guitar, backing vocals (2010–2022)
Sean "Coo" Cullen – rhythm guitar (2010–2016)

Timeline

Discography

Studio albums

EPs

Demo

Bootlegs

Singles

Awards and nominations

Tours 

 On Tour There Is No Law (U.S.)
 Support for Twitching Tongues (September 30–October 14) alongside Stigmata, Downpresser and Angel Du$t
Spring 2014 Tour (U.S.) — February 5–15, 2015
Support from Diamond Youth, Turnover (February 5–12), Angel Du$t and Blind Justice
 Bane Farewell Tour (U.S.) — May 23–June 2, 2014
 Support for Bane alongside Take Offense
 Set It Off 20th Anniversary Tour (U.S.) — December 5–14, 2014
 Support for Madball alongside Death Before Dishonor, Take Offense and Downpresser
 Nonstop Feeling East Coast Tour (U.S.) — February 12–22, 2015
 Support from Superheaven, Freedom, True Love, Adventures (February 22) and Fiddlehead (February 22)
Nonstop Feeling West Coast Tour (U.S.) — February 27–March 4, 2015
Support from Superheaven, Take Offense, Forced Order and Seasons Change
Sleep When I Die Tour (U.S.) — March 13–April 12, 2015
Support for New Found Glory alongside This Wild Life and Turnover
 The Life & Death Tour 2015 (U.S.) — August 6–31, 2015
 Support for Bane alongside Forced Order, Mizery (August 9–28), Malfunction, Power Trip (August 24–30), Death Threat (August 7), Bitter End (August 29) and Crown of Thornz (August 14–16, August 26–28)
Europe Tour 2015 (Europe) — November 18–30, 2015
Support from Forced Order
 Self-Titled Tour (U.K.) — December 1–12, 2015
 Support for The Story So Far and Drug Church
New Zealand 2016 (New Zealand) — January 7–9, 2016
Support from Out Cold, Hammer Time and Lookin' Up
 Australia 2016 (Australia) — January 13–24, 2016
 Support from Born Free
 Spring 2016 Tour (U.S.) — April 6–May 1, 2016
 Support for Basement alongside Defeater and Colleen Green
European Summer 2016 (U.K. and Europe)
Support for Backtrack (June 20–23) alongside Higher Power (June 26–30)
 Spring 2017 Tour (U.S.) — May 13–21, 2017
 Support for The Story So Far alongside Drug Church
 Included appearances at Northern Invasion Fest and Rock on the Range
 Fall 2017 Tour (U.S.) — November 7–December 3, 2017
 Support for The Story So Far alongside Drug Church
The Good Nature Australian Tour (Australia) — March 5–13, 2018
Support for Turnover
 Time & Space Tour (U.S.) — April 9–May 7, 2018
 Support from Touché Amoré, Culture Abuse and Razorbumps
Time & Space S. Korea and Southeast Asia Tour (South Korea and Asia) — June 30–July 8, 2018
Time & Space Europe Tour (U.K. and Europe) — June 14–July 13, 2018
Support from Fury (June 14–19, June 21–27)
Included appearances at 2000 Tress Festival and Resurrection Fest
Celebrating 20 Years of Bullshit (U.S.) — November 12–December 16, 2018
Support for Every Time I Die alongside Angel Du$t and Vein
 Australia Tour 2019 (Australia) — January 12–19, 2019
 Co-headlined alongside Citizen
 Spring 2019 Tour (U.S.) — April 5–May 12, 2019
 Support for Turnover alongside Reptaliens
 Share a View in Europe 2020 (U.K. and Europe) — March 3–15, 2020
 Support from Gag, One Step Closer and Glitterer
 Glow On Record Release Tour (U.S.) — August 22–September 26, 2021
 Support from Show Me the Body (August 28–30), Never Ending Game (August 28–30), Gulch (August 30), Lil Ugly Mane (September 2), Narrow Head (September 2), Hey Cowboy! (September 2) and Sexpill (September 2)
 Included appearances at Firefly Festival, Louder Than Life Festival, Knotfest and Furnace Fest
 Grey Day Tour 2021 (U.S.)
 Support for $uicideboy$ (September 29–November 16, 2021) alongside Slowthai, Chief Keef, Yung Gravy, Night Lovell, Ramirez, Germ, Shakewell and Chetta
 Glow On Live in Europe (U.K. and Europe) — January 29–February 15, 2022
 Support from Chubby and the Gang
 The Turnstile Love Connection Tour (U.S.) — February 23–May 26, 2022
 Support from Citizen, Ceremony, Ekulu, Truth Cult, Coco & Clair Clair (February 23 and 24), Special Interest (May 22) and Beach Fossils (May 22)
Glow On Live in Europe (U.K. and Europe – festivals) — June 19–August 19, 2022
European music festival circuit
Reunion Tour (U.S.) 
Supporting My Chemical Romance (August 20–26) alongside Dilly Dally (August 20–24) and Soul Glo (August 26)
 The Turnstile Love Connection Tour (U.S. – Leg 2) — October 3–November 20, 2022 
 Support from Snail Mail and JPEGMafia (October 3–31)

References

Musical groups established in 2010
Musical groups from Baltimore
Hardcore punk groups from Maryland
2010 establishments in Maryland
Musical quintets
Melodic hardcore groups